Jamie Baldwin is a fictional character from the British ITV soap opera Coronation Street, played by Rupert Hill. He first appeared in 2004 and left in 2008.

Storylines
Shortly after his arrival in Weatherfield, Jamie began dating Leanne Battersby. He left her briefly for her enemy Maria Sutherland, but eventually reconciled with Leanne again. She then embarked on an affair with his father, Danny. When this was revealed, Jamie broke up with Leanne and disowned Danny. Jamie's mother, Carol, came to Weatherfield and stayed with Jamie and Frankie, who had thrown Danny out because of his affair with Leanne. He supported her during her attempts to give up drinking, but she tried to destroy his relationship with Frankie, unsuccessfully. He later failed in a rebound romance with Joanne Jackson, as his mother's continuing problems, which dominated his life. After Carol schemed to break the bond between Jamie and Frankie by insinuating that they fancied each other, they decided to kick her out and Jamie disowned her.

Jamie began dating Violet Wilson, following her split from Jason Grimshaw, who had had an affair with Sarah Platt. Violet moved in with Jamie, but Jamie's secret love for Frankie affected their relationship. Jamie and Violet split after a holiday abroad and he then declared his love for Frankie. The relationship lasted until Danny caught Jamie and Frankie in bed together. Danny and Jamie had a fight which resulted in Danny almost killing Jamie, after he was left unconscious in the canal but Danny dived in to save him.

After another confrontation between them, Danny "signed" everything over to Jamie and disappeared. Jamie told Violet about the affair with Frankie after she told him that she was pregnant, leaving her horrified. With Danny still missing, Jamie and Frankie planned to move to Spain, bound for a new life, and Jamie quit his job at King's Robes. However, on New Year's Eve, Frankie changed her mind and left Weatherfield alone. Following his split from Frankie, Jamie was employed at local cab firm StreetCars by Steve McDonald. Jamie disapproved of Sean Tully, who was homosexual, and Violet's plan to have a baby but eventually apologized for his attitude; however, when Jamie invited Violet to join him at Carol's wedding, there was an obvious attraction. Jamie and Violet later reconciled and planned to raise her and Sean's baby together. Following the baby's birth, they planned to leave Weatherfield and raise baby Dylan in London, excluding Sean. Violet then proposed to Jamie, who accepted, before filling the car with their belongings set to leave.

Violet's sister, Lauren, spotted Jamie loading the car. He claimed that he was attending a stag do, but she realized their plan when he loaded a pushchair. Lauren wasted no time in informing Sean. As Violet and Jamie drove off, Lauren, Sean, and his partner, Marcus Dent, attempted to stop them, but they escaped and Violet disposed of her phone, so that Sean could not get into contact with them again.
In April 2011, Sean goes to London to visit Dylan and sees Violet and Jamie rowing. Jamie reveals that Violet had had an affair with a gardener. Sean decides to take Dylan out for the day with Marcus, who is also living in London. As Sean and Marcus return to Violet's house, they see Jamie leave in a taxi. Violet reveals that she and Jamie have split up.

Casting
Fans of actor Rupert Hill speculated that he claimed that the plot involving on-screen granddad Mike Baldwin's (Johnny Briggs) death was unpleasant, this even inspired him to raise cash to help individuals diagnosed with such diseases.

Based on the sexual relationship between Jamie's character and his step-mum, Rupert Hill claimed that he wasn't quite sure about Jamie's true feeling for Frankie, though he could clarify why Jamie had such feelings, he was concerned about how the storyline had an uncomfortable atmosphere, he admitted that he and Debra Stephenson, who played Frankie, were wary about filming these scenes, thinking it was sensational and irregular, though the scripts they received were more than interesting. He claimed that it had given he and Debra a new dimension to their relationship, and that the filming was enjoyable as of the deep plot. He also described the plotline as "fantastic".

Development

Departure
On 16 April 2007, a spokesperson for Coronation Street confirmed that Rupert Hill had decided to leave the show after his contract expired. Speaking of his decision a spokesperson for Coronation Street told showbiz website Digital Spy: "Rupert has indicated to the producers that he intends to leave the show at the end of his current contract but the length of this contract means that he will remain with the show until about this time next year." In May 2010, Hill revealed that leaving Coronation Street was a big risk for him, Reflecting on his stint on the soap opera, Hill told the Birmingham Post: "I got paid incredibly well, and starring in Coronation Street was a very enjoyable job, and I made really good friends. But I've always wanted to be an actor. And part of what attracted me to the profession was the diversity of roles you can get. In the end I accepted that I was going to have to take a pay cut and face up to the possibility that I might never work again. It didn't matter, though. I had to take a risk and leave Corrie in 2007 because I didn't want to play Jamie Baldwin for the next 25 years."

Return
In March 2011, the show bosses announced that Hill, along with former co star Jenny Platt, would return for one episode set in London in which Sean Tully, played by Antony Cotton, would go to visit them. A Coronation Street spokesperson stated: "It will be a real treat for Corrie viewers to see Sean exploring the sights of London, whilst at the same time Todd returns to Weatherfield to catch up with his mum. Sean is desperate to be a real dad to Dylan so when Violet says he can visit he is thrilled, but when he arrives in the capital he is in for a few surprises."

Reception
The storyline in which saw his character and Frankie have an affair, was considered "sick" by many viewers.

The level of fame that came with appearing in the ITV soap never appealed to actor Hill, which led to his exit, also bound to pursue different roles in acting. Co-star Jenny Platt also announced her exit, alongside Jamie.

Awards
In the British Soap Awards 2007, Rupert Hill was in the top category for the 'sexiest male', but Rob James-Collier (Liam Connor) won the award.

References

External links
Jamie Baldwin at What's on TV

Coronation Street characters
Fictional taxi drivers
Television characters introduced in 2004
Male characters in television